The Grauer School, founded in 1991 by Stuart Grauer, is a private college preparatory day school in Encinitas, California. The school is operated by the Grauer Foundation for Education, a California not-for-profit corporation. The school is a member of the Encinitas Chamber of Commerce and is the region's only UNESCO-Associated school.

In 2013, The Grauer School was ranked #10 on Outsidemagazine's list of 100 Best Places to Work.

History 
Stuart Grauer began the school shortly after completing doctoral work at the University of San Diego and 17 years working at six other schools.

References

 http://www.petersons.com/pschools/code/instVC.asp?inunid=134696&sponsor=1

External links
 

Education in San Diego County, California
High schools in San Diego County, California
Private middle schools in California
Educational institutions established in 1991
Encinitas, California
Private high schools in California
1991 establishments in California